Marty Padgett is a United States based journalist, and the editorial director of Internet Brands Automotive's The Car Connection, Motor Authority, and Green Car Reports.

Born in 1969, Padgett is a native of Washington, D.C., and grew up in southern Maryland before going to college at Duke University (history, '91, with honors) and moving to Michigan. He edited the news section in Car and Driver magazine for five years and wrote road tests. He also appeared on several national radio television programs including CNN's TalkBack Live and Fox Morning News.

After a short turn in public relations at Mercedes-Benz in Alabama, Padgett moved to Atlanta, where he began writing for publications including Details, Men's Health, Stuff, and AutoWeek. He also worked for AutoTrader before taking on the editorial duties at The Car Connection.

Padgett lives in Atlanta, Georgia. He earned his Master of Fine Arts (MFA) from the University of Georgia's Grady College of Journalism and Mass Communications. He was named a 2019 Lambda Literary Fellow for nonfiction.

His nonfiction book about Atlanta's LGBTQ civil rights movement, A Night at the Sweet Gum Head: Drag, Drugs, Disco, and Atlanta's Gay Revolution, will be published by W.W. Norton in 2021.

Awards

2003 International Wheel Award Winners

Padgett co-won 2nd place in this award in the "New story or series" category for "Ford Cuts 35,000 Jobs, 5 Plants." It was commented on as "consistent, hard-edged, quick-hit reporting provides breaking news."

Publications

Books
In order of date published

A Night at the Sweet Gum Head, the story of Atlanta's LGBTQ civil rights movement, by W.W. Norton, 2021.

Web
 Marty Padgett: Editorial Director at Internet Brands Automotive
 Interview transcript on CNN

References

Living people
Motoring journalists
Year of birth missing (living people)